Rebecca Ballhaus (born July 1991) is a Pulitzer Prize-winning American journalist who covers the White House for The Wall Street Journal.

Early life
Ballhaus was born in New York to German cinematographer Florian Ballhaus and screenwriter Pamela Katz. She is the granddaughter to the famous German cinematographer Michael Ballhaus. She attended Berkeley Carroll School and received a B.A. in Political Science from Brown University in 2013.

Career
Ballhaus began her journalism career as an intern at the Huffington Post while still an undergraduate at Brown. She later became the managing editor of The Brown Daily Herald, the university newspaper.

Ballhaus joined The Wall Street Journal as a summer intern in 2013. She was made a full-time reporter at the Washington bureau three months later, and covered the 2016 election as a national political reporter.

Since 2017, Ballhaus has covered the White House and money in politics. She has frequently appeared on CNN, MSNBC and NPR as a political analyst. In 2019, along with other members of the Wall Street Journal, Rebecca won a Pulitzer Prize for her coverage of Trump's direction of payments from Michael Cohen to Stormy Daniels.

References

External links 
Rebecca Ballhaus on Twitter
Rebecca Ballhaus on C-SPAN

American women journalists
American newspaper journalists
Brown University alumni
The Wall Street Journal people
HuffPost writers and columnists
Journalists from New York City
Living people
1991 births
21st-century American journalists
21st-century American women writers